Seafarer 31 may refer to:

Seafarer 31 Mark I
Seafarer 31 Mark II